Alessandro Filonardi (died 1645) was a Roman Catholic prelate who served as Bishop of Aquino (1615–1645).

Biography
Alessandro Filonardi was born in Terra Balbaei.
On 18 May 1615, he was appointed during the papacy of Pope Paul V as Bishop of Aquino.
On 31 May 1615, he was consecrated bishop by Filippo Filonardi, Cardinal-Priest of Santa Maria del Popolo, with Paolo de Curtis, Bishop Emeritus of Isernia, and Ennio Filonardi, Bishop of Ferentino, serving as co-consecrators. 
He served as Bishop of Aquino until his death on 21 Jan 1645.

Episcopal succession
While bishop, he was the principal co-consecrator of:

References

External links and additional sources
 (for Chronology of Bishops) 
 (for Chronology of Bishops) 

17th-century Italian Roman Catholic bishops
Bishops appointed by Pope Paul V
1645 deaths